Santa Clarita Diet is an American horror-comedy television series created by Victor Fresco for the streaming service Netflix, starring  Drew Barrymore and Timothy Olyphant. Fresco serves as the showrunner, and is an executive producer alongside Barrymore, Olyphant, Aaron Kaplan, Tracy Katsky, Chris Miller, Ember Truesdell and Ruben Fleischer. The series centers on husband and wife real estate team Joel and Sheila Hammond whose normal, mundane lives change dramatically when Sheila shows symptoms of having become a zombie. The bewildered family seek a cure for her condition while dealing with its consequences, such as Sheila's new craving of human flesh and radically altered personality that has become more primal and impulsive.

The single-camera series premiered on February 3, 2017. The first season, consisting of 10 episodes, received generally positive reviews. On March 29, 2017, it was announced that Netflix renewed the series for a second season, which premiered on March 23, 2018. On May 8, 2018, the series was renewed for a 10-episode third season and premiered on March 29, 2019. The series was cancelled after three seasons on April 26, 2019.

Plot
Joel and Sheila Hammond are everyday suburban real estate agents in Santa Clarita, California. The couple face a series of obstacles when Sheila undergoes a metamorphosis, becomes undead and starts craving human flesh. As Joel and the family try to help Sheila through this, they have to deal with neighbors and cultural norms, and get to the bottom of a potentially mythological mystery.

Cast

Main

 Drew Barrymore as Sheila Hammond, Joel's wife and Abby's mother.
 Timothy Olyphant as Joel Hammond, Sheila's husband and Abby's father.
 Liv Hewson as Abby Hammond, Sheila and Joel's daughter.
 Skyler Gisondo as Eric Bemis, the Hammonds' neighbor, Lisa's son and Dan's stepson.

Recurring
 Ricardo Chavira as Dan Palmer (season 1), a sheriff's deputy, the Hammonds' neighbor, and Eric's stepfather who is killed by Joel with a shovel and later eaten by Sheila.
 Mary Elizabeth Ellis as Lisa Palmer, Dan's wife, Eric's mother, and Sheila's friend.
 Andy Richter as Carl Coby, the Hammonds' obnoxious boss.
 Richard T. Jones as Rick, a Santa Monica police officer, the Hammonds' neighbor, and Joel's friend.
 Joy Osmanski as Alondra, Rick's wife and Sheila's friend.
 Kaylee Bryant as Sarah, a classmate of Abby and Eric's.
 Nathan Fillion (seasons 1–2) and Alan Tudyk (season 3) as Gary West, a realtor and the Hammonds' co-worker. He is the first person Sheila kills and eats who later turns into a zombie, though only his decayed, severed head remains and is kept by the Hammonds out of guilt.
 Natalie Morales as Anne Garcia, a religious sheriff's deputy and Dan's partner who becomes romantically involved with Lisa after Dan goes missing.
 Thomas Lennon as Andrei Novak, the principal of Santa Clarita High School.
 Ramona Young as Ramona, a wise Rite-Aid employee who turns out to be a zombie.
Sydney Park as Winter, a classmate of Abby and Eric's who is in environmental club with them.
 Grace Zabriskie as Mrs. Bakavić (season 1), Novak's Serbian grandmother.
 DeObia Oparei as Loki Hayes (season 1), a convicted felon. He turns into a zombie when Sheila is unsuccessful in killing him.
 Jonathan Slavin as Ron, an asylum inmate, who was later released and who Joel told his little secret to in season 2. Ron later becomes a zombie in season 3, by forcing Gary to bite him.
 Joel McHale as Chris, a realtor who is married to Christa
 Maggie Lawson as Christa, a realtor who is married to Chris
 Zachary Knighton as Paul (seasons 2–3), Marsha's husband and a descendant of the Knights of Serbia, who has been tasked with ending the zombie outbreak
 Jee Young Han as Marsha (season 2), Paul's wife, who is helping him with the mission to end the zombie outbreak
 Ethan Suplee as Tommy (season 3), Paul's brother, former Marine Corps sniper, crossbow enthusiast and a descendant of the Knights of Serbia, who has taken over his brother's mission
Shalita Grant as FBI Agent Tess Rogers in season 3
 Matt Shively as Christian (seasons 2–3), a student at Abby and Eric's school who is also Chris and Christa's son
 Linda Lavin as Jean, a woman Sheila delivers Meals on Wheels to and is later turned into a zombie by Sheila.
 Goran Višnjić as Dobrivoje Poplović (season 3), a man who works in Serbia who is transferred to Santa Clarita

Guest
 Portia de Rossi as Dr. Cora Wolf, a scientist focused on the undead. 
 Markie Post as Becky, a client of the Hammonds'.
 Patton Oswalt as Dr. Hasmedi, a virologist.
 Ryan Hansen as Bob Jonas, Lisa Palmer's lover.
 Derek Waters as Anton, a conspiracy theorist.
 Ravi Patel as Ryan, a convention goer.
 Gerald McRaney as Ed Thune, a retired army colonel.
 Leo Howard as Sven, a classmate of Abby and Eric's who goes on a date with Abby.
 Malcolm Barrett as Morgan, a friend of Ron's in season 3.
 Miraj Grbić as Vlado
 Kerri Kenney-Silver as Petra Blazic (season 3), Grand Prior of the Knights of Serbia.

Episodes

Series overview

Season 1 (2017)

Season 2 (2018)

Season 3 (2019)

Production

Development
Fresco came up with the premise from wanting to make "a family show with an interesting approach that we haven't seen before". The zombie angle also allowed Fresco to explore the concept of narcissism: he stated "the undead are the ultimate narcissists. They want what they want when they want it and will do anything to just have what they want and don't care about other people's needs."

For the setting, Fresco drew from his own experience growing up in San Fernando Valley. Santa Clarita was chosen because of its middle class residents. The Hammonds' profession as realtors was chosen because "it gets them out into the world" as well as the "forced friendliness" inherent to the profession.

Promotion
Hal Johnson and Joanne McLeod appeared in a Canadian promo for the series, promoting the eponymous "diet" in a parody of their Body Break series of television PSAs.

In February 2017, advertising for the show sparked criticism in Germany, where Netflix promoted the show with posters depicting a human finger sliced up like a currywurst, a popular German fast food dish. After receiving more than 50 complaints that the advertising was glorifying violence and inducing fear, especially in children, the German Advertising Council, a self-regulatory institution, forwarded the complaints to the company. Netflix then decided to end the campaign and remove all posters.

Critical reception
The first season of Santa Clarita Diet received generally positive reviews from critics. On Rotten Tomatoes, the season has an approval rating of 78% based on 73 reviews, with an average rating of 7.20/10. The site's critical consensus reads, "Santa Clarita Diet serves up an excellent cast, frequent laughs, and an engaging premise — but the level of gore might not be to everyone's taste." Metacritic reports that the first season received "generally favorable reviews" with a score of 67 out of 100, based on 30 critics.

The second season received generally positive reviews as well. The season has an approval rating of 89% based on 19 reviews, with an average rating of 7.85/10 on Rotten Tomatoes. The site's critical consensus states: "Santa Clarita Diet rides the momentum of its freshman season with non-stop comedic gore and a big heart that bleeds — profusely — for its lovable characters."

The third season has an approval rating of 100% based on 18 reviews, with an average rating of 7.78/10 on Rotten Tomatoes. The website's critical consensus reads, "Santa Clarita Diet third season is a generous meal of entrails, morbid humor, and a touching affirmation of marital love — with Barrymore and Olyphant's pitch-perfect chemistry brightening each blood-soaked installment."

References

External links
 
 

2010s American black comedy television series
2010s American horror comedy television series
2017 American television series debuts
2019 American television series endings
Cannibalism in fiction
English-language Netflix original programming
Murder in television
Santa Clarita, California
Television series about dysfunctional families
Television series about marriage
Television series by Kapital Entertainment
Television series created by Victor Fresco
Television shows set in Los Angeles County, California
Zombies in television